Dead Wrong may refer to:

"Dead Wrong", a 2012 song by Adler from Back from the Dead
"Dead Wrong", an episode of Bonanza
Dead Wrong, a film starring Britt Ekland
"Dead Wrong", a song by All That Remains from For We Are Many
"Dead Wrong" (song), by The Notorious B.I.G.
"Dead Wrong", a song by FEMM from Femm-Isation
"Dead Wrong", a 2005 song by the Fray from How to Save a Life
"Dead Wrong" (comics), the first story arc of Runaways' third volume
Dead Wrong (TV series), a Hong Kong television drama starring Roger Kwok